Sovetsk is a town in Shchyokinsky District of Tula Oblast, Russia, located on the Upa River (Oka's basin),  south of Tula, the administrative center of the oblast. The population of Sovetsk was 7,889 at the 2021 census.

History
It was founded in 1950 as the work settlement of Sovetsky. It was granted town status in 1954.

Administrative and municipal status
In regards to the administrative divisions it is incorporated within Shchyokinsky District as Sovetsk Town Under District Jurisdiction. As a municipal division, Sovetsk Town Under District Jurisdiction is incorporated within Shchyokinsky Municipal District as Sovetsk Urban Settlement.

Demographics
As of the 2021 census, the population of Sovetsk is 7,889. At the 2002 and 1989 censuses, it was 8,770 and 10,077 respectively, showing a gradual decline in population. However, when compared to the 2010 census where the population was of 7,536 the statistics show a 0.42% increase.

References

Notes

Cities and towns in Tula Oblast
Cities and towns built in the Soviet Union
Populated places established in 1950